Badis was a town in Morocco, 110 km southeast of Tétouan, between the territory of the Ghomara and the Rif; the Banu Yattufat (Ait Yitufut) live in the area.

History 
Badis was part of the Kingdom of Nekor, and after the Idrisids, Almoravids, Almohads, and Marinids; the last three dynasties used it as a naval base. It had some importance under the Marinid sultan Abu Said and paid the same taxes—1000 dinars—as Melilla and Larache. Badis had an arsenal and shipyards. The population engaged in fishing and piracy and was the seat of the governor of the Rif that embraced the entire coast and some inland tribes (Bukkuya, Banu Mansur, Banu Khalid, Banu Yadir). In his visit to the town, Leo Africanus described it as having 600 households.

About 100 meters, there are two rocky islets, the largest called Hajar Badis, which the Spaniards call Peñón de Vélez, and which they occupied in 1508, an occupation that lasted until 1520. In 1526 the Wattasid sultan Abu Hassun, dethroned by his brother, received as a feud the Rif, with his seat at Badis (for this reason he was called al-Badisi). In 1554 he ceded the city and island to his Ottoman allies in Algiers who made it a nest for pirates operating in the Strait of Gibraltar. The Saadid sultan Abdallah al-Ghalib saw this activity and the Ottoman presence with a very bad eye, as it could be a base for the conquest of his kingdom, and in 1564 he ceded the town and island to Spain; the Moroccan inhabitants were evacuated. The town was depopulated and soon fell into ruins. The rock is still preserved by the Spaniards and named Peñón de Vélez de la Gomera.

Notable natives or residents 

 Abd al-Haqq al-Badisi, a Moroccan biographer
 Abu Yaqub Yusuf al-Zuhayli al-Badisi, a 14th century Moroccan saint and savant
 Ali Abu Hassun, Wattasid sultan, lived in Badis from 1526 to 1549.

References 

Former populated places in Morocco

Sources